The 1939 Hurstville state by-election was held on 18 March 1939 for the New South Wales Legislative Assembly electorate of Hurstville because of the death of James Webb.

Dates

Result

James Webb died.

See also
Electoral results for the district of Hurstville
List of New South Wales state by-elections

References

1939 elections in Australia
New South Wales state by-elections
1930s in New South Wales